Nadikudi railway station (station code:NDKD), is a railway junction in Guntur district, Andhra Pradesh, India.

History
Historically, Nadikudi was a metre-gauge station. Trains which travelled from Guntur to Macherla used to pass through Nadikudi. Later, Guntur–Macherla section, Tenali–Macherla section was converted from metre gauge to broad gauge and a new line was laid from Bibinagar near Hyderabad to Nadikudi, thus making Nadikudi a junction.

Route
Trains that go to Macherla divert at Nadikudi Junction. The nearest town to Nadikudi is Dachepalle.
Nadikudi is located on the Pagidipalli–Nallapadu section of Guntur Division(GNT), in South Central Railway zone (SCR).

Connectivity 
Nadikude Junction is well connected with Guntur, Hyderabad, Vijayawada, Vizag and other important destinations like  Tirupati, Chennai, Trivandrum Central, Kakinada, Nagarsol, Narsapur, Mumbai, Pune, Bhavnagar Terminus, Ahmedabad. Nadikude Junction have 34 trains passing through it, of which there are 2 Terminating and 2 Originating trains including Kacheguda- Nadikude-Kacheguda Demu.

Amenities
Some of the basic amenities available in Nadikudi railway station are :

•	Automatic Ticket Vending Machine (ATVM)

•	Reservation booking counter

•	Parking facility

•	Display Boards

•	LED Displays

•	Waiting halls (also reserved waiting hall)

•	Catering stalls

•	Cool drinking water

•	Washrooms

•	Exclusive washrooms & drinking water facilities for divyaang.

•	Sitting benches

•	Foot Over Bridge

Station category 

Nadikudi railway station is classified as a D–category station. It is one of the four Model stations in the Guntur railway division of South Central Railway zone.

Freight 
It handles freight traffic and the main commodities include, cement, rice and paddy.

See also 
 List of railway stations in India

References

Railway stations in Guntur district
Railway stations in Guntur railway division
Railway stations opened in 1930
Railway junction stations in Andhra Pradesh
1930 establishments in India